Harrison Hickey "Harry" Sawyer (born 31 December 1996) is an Australian professional footballer who plays as a striker for Indian Super League club Jamshedpur.

Career
He rejoined Western Pride in 2017 after making his professional debut with the Newcastle Jets. Sawyer later joined the Davao Aguilas of the Philippines Football League within the same year. Although arriving halfway through the 2017 season, Sawyer was awarded with the club's golden boot, scoring 10 goals.

In July 2018, Sawyer was sent on loan to Hong Kong club Tai Po. Sawyer made an impressive start, scoring a hat trick on debut. His side went on to win the 2018/19 Hong Kong Premier League title, whilst competing in the AFC Cup. Sawyer finished the season with 10 goals across all competitions. 

On 20 October 2019, it was announced that Sawyer would return to Australia, signing with NPL club South Melbourne. Sawyer went on to score 25 goals across 42 appearances for the club. His tenure at the club included a season-long loan to Gold Coast Knights in 2020, during the pandemic interrupted season. He Gold Coast Knights goal scoring charts, scoring 15 goals in 19 appearances. Upon returning to South Melbourne, Sawyer's first full-season with the club ultimately ended in success, with his side winning the 2022 National Premier League Premiership. Sawyer finished the season as the competitions leading goal scorer, with 17 goals. 

On 10 August 2022, it was announced Sawyer had signed for Indian Super League side Jamshedpur FC.

Honours

Club
Tai Po
 Hong Kong Premier League: 2018–19
South Melbourne 
 National Premier Leagues Victoria: 2022

Personal 

 National Premier Leagues Victoria Golden Boot: 2022

References

External links

Harrison Sawyer at Sports TG

1996 births
Living people
Association football forwards
Australian soccer players
Newcastle Jets FC players
Brisbane Roar FC players
Tai Po FC players
Sydney FC players
A-League Men players
Hong Kong Premier League players
National Premier Leagues players
Expatriate footballers in the Philippines
Expatriate footballers in Hong Kong
Australian expatriate sportspeople in Hong Kong
Davao Aguilas F.C. players
Soccer players from Brisbane
Australian expatriate soccer players
Australian expatriate sportspeople in the Philippines
Australian expatriate sportspeople in India
Expatriate footballers in India